Knapton is a village in the English County of Norfolk.

Knapton may also refer to:

Places
Knapton, North Yorkshire, a village on the outskirts of the English City of York
East Knapton, a village in North Yorkshire, England 
West Knapton, a village in North Yorkshire, England
Knapton railway station, located in the English County of East Riding of Yorkshire
Knapton Hill, part of the Upper Town Hill Formation of Bermuda

People
George Knapton, English 18th-century portrait painter
John Knapton (disambiguation), several people
Philip Knapton (1788–1833), English organist and composer
Viscount de Vesci, title in the Peerage of Ireland created in the 18th century for Baron Knapton